"In My Car" is a single by the Beatles' former drummer, Ringo Starr. The track is credited as being written by Mo Foster, Kim Goody, Richard Starkey, and Joe Walsh. The track was included on Starr's ninth solo studio album, Old Wave, which was produced by the Eagles' lead guitarist, Joe Walsh in 1983.

The single was re-released, this time on yellow vinyl for jukeboxes only, with "She's About a Mover" as the B-side, on the label The Right Stuff on 1 November 1994, 11 years after the first release.

Personnel
 Ringo Starr – lead vocals, drums, percussion
 Joe Walsh – lead guitar, backing vocals
 Mo Foster – bass guitar
 Chris Stainton – keyboards
 Gary Brooker – keyboards
 Mark Easterling – backing vocals
 Steve Hess – backing vocals
 Patrick Maroshek – backing vocals

Cover version
In 1987, Joe Walsh, the single's producer and co-songwriter, recorded a cover version for his eighth solo studio album Got Any Gum?, which was released as a single and became a moderate hit.

References

Ringo Starr songs
1983 singles
1983 songs
Joe Walsh songs
1987 singles
Songs written by Joe Walsh
Songs written by Ringo Starr
Bellaphon Records singles